Whaling is a single by New Zealand band DD Smash. It was released in 1984 as the second single from The Optimist. The single charted at No. 8 in New Zealand and number 70 in Australia.

It was voted the 12th best New Zealand song of the 20th century by members of APRA in 2001.

References

External links
 Whaling video (NZ On Screen)
 Musical analysis of 'Whaling' on AudioCulture

1984 singles
APRA Award winners
DD Smash songs
1984 songs
Mushroom Records singles
Songs written by Dave Dobbyn